Sethuraman Panchanathan is an Indian-American computer scientist and academic administrator, and the 15th Director of National Science Foundation since June 2020. He previously served as the Executive Vice President, ASU Knowledge Enterprise Development and Chief Research and Innovation Officer at Arizona State University (ASU). He was also Director of the Center for Cognitive Ubiquitous Computing (CUbiC), Foundation Chair of Computing and Informatics at ASU and Professor in the School of Computing, Informatics, and Decision Systems Engineering (CIDSE), part of the Ira A. Fulton Schools of Engineering.

Early life and education 
Panchanathan was born and raised in Chennai. He attended the Vivekananda College (University of Madras), graduating in 1981 with a B.Sc. in physics. Subsequently, in 1984, he earned a B.E. in Electronics and Communication Engineering from the Indian Institute of Science in Bangalore, India. In 1986, he completed his M.Tech. in Electrical Engineering from the Indian Institute of Technology, Madras. He later enrolled in the doctoral program at the University of Ottawa, Canada, and received his Ph.D. in Electrical and Computer Engineering in 1989 while working under the direction of Morris Goldberg.

Academic career 
After receiving his Ph.D. from the University of Ottawa in 1989, Panchanathan stayed on at Ottawa as an assistant professor and was later promoted to associate professor in 1994 after receiving tenure.

Panchanathan moved to Arizona in 1997 as a tenured associate professor in the Department of Computer Science and Engineering at ASU. In 2001, he was promoted to full professor and founded the Center for Cognitive Ubiquitous Computing (CUbiC), which is focused on designing technologies and devices for assisting individuals with disabilities. He also founded and led the School of Computing and Informatics (2006-2009) and the Department of Biomedical Informatics (2005-2007).

Panchanathan was appointed as the university Chief Research Officer in 2009, where he was responsible for conceptualizing and building large interdisciplinary initiatives at ASU. In 2011, he was promoted to Senior Vice President of ASU's Office of Knowledge Enterprise Development, for the advancement of research, entrepreneurship, innovation and economic development activities.

In 2016, Panchanathan was promoted to Executive Vice President, ASU Knowledge Enterprise Development and Chief Research and Innovation Officer at ASU. In this role, Dr. Panchanathan leads the advancement of research, innovation, entrepreneurship, corporate engagement and strategic partnerships, and international development. Under his leadership, ASU's research has grown exponentially, with annual research expenditures quadrupling to more than half a billion dollars over the past 15 years. Continuing on its path as a rapidly growing research enterprise, Arizona State University reported $635 million in research expenditures for fiscal year 2018, up from $545 million in FY17, according to a recent report by the U.S. National Science Foundation. At that time, ASU was holding its rank at No. 44 for total research expenditures in the U.S., remaining ahead of the California Institute of Technology and the University of Chicago. Among institutions without a medical school, ASU ranked No. 8, ahead of Princeton University and Carnegie Mellon University. In a 2017 Brazilian Congress of Industry Innovation panel discussion, Panchanathan highlighted how universities like ASU ought to work hand-in-hand with businesses to create curriculum that fosters the entrepreneurial traits employers look for today, in order to produce a future of innovation ecosystems. On October 22, 2019, Panchanathan testified before the U.S. Senate Subcommittee on Science, Oceans, Fisheries, and Weather in a hearing titled, "Research and Innovation: Ensuring America's Economic and Strategic Leadership," examining the role that research and innovation play in ensuring U.S. leadership in the global economy.

National Science Foundation
On June 13, 2014, Panchanathan was nominated by President Barack Obama as a member of the National Science Board of National Science Foundation.

On December 19, 2019, President Donald Trump announced his intent to nominate Panchanathan to replace France Córdova as Director of the National Science Foundation. On June 18, 2020, he was unanimously confirmed by the US Senate as the new Director of the National Science Foundation. In 2022, the Director announced the Technology, Innovation and Partnerships directorate — NSF's first new directorate in more than 30 years. He assumed office on June 23, 2020.

Research interests 

His research interests include Human-centered Multimedia Computing (HCMC), assistive and rehabilitative technologies, haptic user interfaces, face/gait analysis and recognition, medical image processing, media processor designs and ubiquitous computing environments for enhancing quality of life for individuals with disabilities. His research contributions have been disseminated in over 425 papers in various refereed journals and conferences and edited more than 30 book and book chapters. He is recognized as a leader in the field of human-centered computing and informatics and has an h-index of 46with over 8000 citations. He also mentored over 100 students and scholars, which include graduate students, post-docs, research engineers and research scientists. He spoke on the importance of fostering a culture of innovation to solve grand challenges that society faces today in a 2017 TEDxASU presentation.

Personal life 
Panchanathan is married to Dr. Sarada "Soumya" Panchanathan, who is a former clinical pediatrician at the Maricopa County Hospital and a former part-time biomedical informatics faculty member from both the University of Arizona College of Medicine, Phoenix, and from ASU. Together they have two children.

Awards, appointments and fellowships 
Advisor for Science and Technology to Arizona Governor Doug Ducey, 2018. 
 Vice President of Strategic Initiatives and Membership for the National Academy of Inventors’ Board of Directors, 2018.
 Appointed to Oak Ridge Associated Universities’ Board of Directors, 2018.
 Appointed to the Forbes Technology Council, 2017–2018.
 Appointed to the National Academy of Inventors Board of Directors, 2017–2018.
 20 People to Know in Arizona Education, Phoenix Business Journal, 2017.
 COO of the Year, Phoenix Business Journal, 2017.
 Distinguished Alumnus Award,  Indian Institute of Technology, Madras, 2017.
 Distinguished Alumnus Award, Alumni Association Awards of Excellence, University of Ottawa, Canada, 2017.
 AAAS Fellow, November 2017  
 Governor's Innovator of the Year for Academia Award, Governor's Celebration of Innovation Awards, Information Technology Centric Assistive and Rehabilitative Environments (iCARE) for Individuals who are Blind and Visually Impaired, Center for Cognitive Ubiquitous Computing, 2004.
 ASU Leadership Award, "Outstanding service and contributions to the ASU Department of Computer Science and Engineering and the School of Computing and Informatics", 2009.
 Academic Collaboration Award, Outstanding Contributions to Improving the lives of Individuals with Disabilities through the iCARE Research Project, ASU Disability Resources for Students, 2004.
 Best paper award, "Configurable Haptic Training System for Laparoscopy", at Medicine Meets Virtual Reality 16 Conference, CA, 2008.
 Canadian Advanced Technology Association (CATA) Best Graduate Thesis Award, Master's Thesis student Mr. Eric Chan, Toronto, 1994.
 Microsoft Imagine Cup 2010 for CUbiC iCARE Note-Taker Project, World Finals in Touch and Tablet category, Warsaw, Poland, 2010.
 Appointed by President Barack Obama to the U.S. National Science Board (NSB) in 2014 for a six-year term. 
 Appointed by Hon. U.S. Secretary of Commerce Penny Pritzker to the National Advisory Council on Innovation and Entrepreneurship (NACIE). Advisor to the Secretary on Advancing Innovation, Entrepreneurship, Workforce Development, Economic Development and Global Competitiveness, 2012–2016.
 Chair of the Council on Research at the Association of Public and Land-grant Universities (APLU) and co-chair of the APLU National Task Force on Managing University Intellectual Property, 2016–2018.
 Fellow of the Institute of Electrical and Electronics Engineers, 2009–present. (IEEE).
 Fellow of the Society for Photo-optical Engineering (SPIE).
 Fellow of the Canadian National Academy of Engineering.
 Fellow of the U.S. National Academy of Inventors
 Fellow of American Association for the Advancement of Science

Works 
 
 
 
 
 S. Panchanathan, S. Chakraborty, T. McDaniel, R. Tadayon, "Person-Centered Multimedia Computing: A New Paradigm Inspired by Assistive and Rehabilitative Applications," IEEE MultiMedia Magazine, Vol. 23, pp. 12–19, August 2016.
 S. Panchanathan, S. Chakraborty, T. McDaniel, "Social Interaction Assistant: A Person-Centered Approach to Enrich Social Interactions for Individuals With Visual Impairments," IEEE Journal of Selected Topics in Signal Processing, Vol. 10(5), pp. 942–951, 2016.
 S. Chakraborty, V. Balasubramanian, and S. Panchanathan, "Adaptive Batch Mode Active Learning," IEEE Transactions on Neural Networks and Learning Systems (TNNLS), Vol. 26(8), pp. 1747–1760, 2015.
 S. Chakraborty, V. Balasubramanian, Q. Sun, S. Panchanathan, and J. Ye, "Active Batch Selection via Convex Relaxations with Guaranteed Solution Bounds," IEEE Transactions on Pattern Analysis and Machine Intelligence, Vol. 37(10), pp. 1945–1958, 2015.
 S. Panchanathan, and T. McDaniel, "Person-centered accessible technologies and computing solutions through interdisciplinary and integrated perspectives from disability research," International Journal Universal Access in the Information Society – Special Issue on User Experience and Access using Augmented and Multimedia Technologies, Vol. 14(3), pp. 415–426, 2014.
 V. Balasubramanian, S. Chakraborty and S. Panchanathan, "Conformal Predictions for Information Fusion," Annals of Mathematics and Artificial Intelligence, Vol. 74, (1–2), pp. 45–65, 2014.
 S. Chakraborty, V. Balasubramanian, S. Panchanathan, "Generalized Batch Mode Active Learning for Biometric Recognition" accepted for publication Pattern Recognition Journal, Elsevier, 2013.
 R. Chattopadhyay, Z. Wang, W. Fan, I. Davidson, S. Panchanathan, J. Ye, "Batch Mode Active Sampling based on Marginal Probability Distribution Matching," Invited Paper. Accepted for publication in ACM Transactions on Knowledge Discovery from Data (TKDD) - Special Issue on the Best of SIGKDD, 2013.
 S. Panchanathan, T. McDaniel, V. Balasubramanian, "An Interdisciplinary Approach to the Design, Development and Deployment of Person-Centered Accessible Technologies," Invited Keynote Paper. Accepted for publication in the proceedings of the IEEE International Conference on Recent Trends in Information Technology (ICRTIT), 2013.
 S. Panchanathan, T. McDaniel, V. Balasubramanian, "Person-centered accessible technologies: Improved usability and adaptation through inspirations from disability research," in Proceedings of the ACM Workshop on User Experience in e-Learning and Augmented Technologies in Education, 2012.
 R. Chattopadhyay, Q. Sun, W. Fan, I. Davidson, S. Panchanathan, and J. Ye, "Multi-Source Domain Adaptation and Its Application to Early Detection of Fatigue," ACM Trans. on Knowledge Discovery from Data (TKDD), 2012.
 R. Chattopadhyay, M. Jesunathadas, B. Poston, M. Santello, J. Ye, and S. Panchanathan, "A Subject-Independent Method for Automatically Grading Electromyographic Features during a Fatiguing Contraction," IEEE Transactions on Biomedical Engineering, Vol. 59(6), pp. 1749, 2012.
 S. Kumar, C. Konikoff, B. Van Emden, C. Busick, K. Davis, S. Ji, L. Wu, T. Brody, J. Ye, S. Panchanathan, T. Karr, K. Gerold, M. McCutchan, and S. Newfeld, "Flyexpress: Visual Mining Of Spatiotemporal Patterns for Genes and Publications in Drosophila Embryogenesis," Bioinformatics, Vol. 27(23), pp. 3319–3320, 2011.
 J. Rosenthal, N. Edwards, D. Villanueva, S. Krishna, T. McDaniel, and S. Panchanathan, "Design, Implementation, and Case Study of a Pragmatic Vibrotactile Belt," IEEE Transactions on Instrumentation and Measurement, Vol. 60(1), pp. 114–125, 2011.
 S. Chakraborty, V. Balasubramanian and S. Panchanathan, et al. "On the Results of the First Mobile Biometry (MOBIO) Face and Speaker Verification Evaluation".  Lecture Notes in Computer Science Vol. 6388, pp. 210 – 225, 2010.
 L. Gade, S. Krishna, and S. Panchanathan, "Person Localization in a Wearable Camera Platform Towards Assistive Technology for Social Interactions," Special Issue of Media Solutions that Improve Accessibility to Disabled Users, Ubiquitous Computing and Communication Journal, Vol. 5, pp. 52–69, 2010.
 M. Vankipuram, K.  Kahol, A.  McLaren, and S. Panchanathan, "A Virtual Reality Simulator for Orthopedic Basic Skills: A Design and Validation Study," Journal of Biomedical Informatics, Vol. 43(5), pp. 661–668, 2010.
 N. C. Krishnan, D. Colbry, C. Juillard and S. Panchanathan, "Recognition of Hand Movements Using Wearable Accelerometers," Special Issue on Wearable Computing, Journal of Ambient Intelligent and Smart Environments, Vol. 1(2), pp. 143–155, 2009.
 S. Panchanathan, N. Krishnan, S. Krishna, T. McDaniel, V. Balasubramanian, "Enriched human-centered multimedia computing through inspirations from disabilities and deficit-centered computing solutions," in Proceedings of the 3rd International Workshop on Human-Centered Computing, 2008, pp. 35–42.
 R. Greenes, and S. Panchanathan, "Biomedical Informatics in the Desert–A New and Unique Program at Arizona State University," IMIA Yearbook of Medical Informatics, pp. 150–156, 2008.
 D. Homa, K. Kahol, P. Tripathi, L. Bratton and S. Panchanathan, "Haptic Concepts in the Blind," Attention, Perception, & Psychophysics, Vol. 71(4), pp. 690–698, 2008.
 K. Kahol, M. Leyba, M. Deka, V. Deka, S. Mayes, M. Smith, J. Ferrara, and S. Panchanathan, "Effect of Fatigue on Psychomotor and Cognitive Skills," American Journal of Surgery, Vol. 195 (2), pp. 195–204, 2008.

References

External links
 ASU Office of Knowledge Enterprise Development

1961 births
Living people
American people of Indian Tamil descent
Arizona State University faculty
IIT Madras alumni
Indian Institute of Science alumni
Scholars from Tamil Nadu
University of Ottawa alumni
Engineers from Tamil Nadu
United States National Science Foundation officials
Indian expatriate academics
Indian emigrants to the United States
People from Chennai
University of Madras alumni
Trump administration personnel
Biden administration personnel
American people of Indian descent